Henry Fuller may refer to:

Henry Mills Fuller (1820–1860), American Whig politician who represented Pennsylvania's 11th congressional district (1851–1853, 1855–1857)
Henry Blake Fuller (1857–1929), American novelist, short story writer and playwright, associated with Chicago
Henry Brown Fuller (1867–1934), American artist
Henry Robert Fuller (1825–1905), mayor of the City of Adelaide (1866–1869)
H. E. Fuller (Henry Ernest Fuller, 1867–1962), architect in South Australia
Harry Fuller (1862–1895), baseball player
Harry Fuller (cricketer) (1896–1974), South African cricketer